Arcadia High School is a public 6-12 school in Arcadia, Louisiana, United States. It is a part of Bienville Parish School Board.

As of the 2015–2016 school year, the school had 296 students, with 95% of them being classified as low income.

History

Professor John H. Davidson became the principal on July 28, 1903. He originated from Junction City, Louisiana.

On September 3, 1907, the school had 300 students.

In 1922 the voters of Arcadia passed a $100,000 bond to build another school building on a 76%-22% basis.

The school auditorium and gymnasium building was destroyed by a fire in October 1973; the junior high school building was salvaged by firefighters and the senior high school did not get damaged. The athletic trophies dating from 1947 were destroyed. A bond for establishing a new school complex for Arcadia High was scheduled for January 15, 1974. The bond passed, and the school district announced it would spend $2 million for that building; the money came from revenue bonds funded by sales taxes and from a $160,000 insurance settlement on the previous building.

Athletics
Arcadia High athletics competes in the LHSAA.

Championships
Football championships
(2) State Championships: 1940, 1965

Notable people
Rush Wimberly - Louisiana state legislature

References

External links
 
 

Public high schools in Louisiana
Public middle schools in Louisiana
Schools in Bienville Parish, Louisiana